The Hungarian Order of Honour (Hungarian: Magyar Becsület Rend) was established in 2011 by Act CCII of 2011. Although the law does not mention the hierarchy, it proposes that the Order of Honour of Hungary is the third highest state award in the Hungarian Order of Honour, after the Hungarian Order of Saint Stephen and the Hungarian Corvin Chain.

According to the text of the law, "the Hungarian Order of Honour is awarded in recognition of outstanding service or heroism in the interests of Hungary and the nation." A maximum of thirty medals may be awarded each year. In all cases, the honours are awarded by the President of the Republic on the recommendation and countersignature of the Prime Minister or the Minister concerned. The medal is usually awarded on a special occasion, usually a national holiday such as 15 March or 23 October, to commemorate a significant event in Hungary's history.

Insignia 
The Order of Hungarian Honour is a badge of the Order of the Holy Crown, suspended from the Holy Crown and decorated with swords crossed at the ears. The insignia is worn on the neck. Oval gold medal, slightly convex design, 47 x 39 mm, with enamelled decoration on the edge. On the obverse, the heraldic image of the coat of arms of Hungary on the left in an oval field. Double cross resting on a triple pile, with an open leafy crown at the base. On the obverse, a wreath of triple laurel leaves with a 13 mm gold border. Above and below, and in the centre of each side, a gold ribbon laid crosswise on top of each other.

List of members

References 

Orders, decorations, and medals of Hungary